Stifler is a surname. Notable people with the surname include: 

 Donna Stifler (born 1965), American politician
 J. Royston Stifler (died 1921), American politician and lawyer
 Mary Cloyd Burnley Stifler (1876–1956), American botanist
 Steve Stifler, character from American Pie

See also
 Stiller (surname)